Fast Tracks is a racing game designed for the Commodore 64 by Mark Turmell and published by Activision in 1986.

Gameplay

The game involves running into other cars on the track. Each time a player bumps another car off the track, the car returns to the start of the lap, and two seconds are removed from the final time. Of course, if the player leaves the track he will have to restart the lap.

A map editor is also available in the game, which can be saved onto the disc. Seven circuits are built-in.

Reception
Roy Wagner reviewed the game for Computer Gaming World, and stated that "Race tracks, that you create, can be sent to friends who don't even have the game. They can then try to beat your best times. This game offers a lot of variety and plays nicely. It comes in a close third to the Racing Destruction Set from EA and Pole Position."

See also
Racing Destruction Set
Rally Speedway

References

External links

1986 video games
Commodore 64 games
Commodore 64-only games
Racing video games
Vehicular combat games
Video games developed in the United States